Cage is a 1989 American martial arts action film  starring Reb Brown and Lou Ferrigno.

Plot
A GI in the Vietnam War saves his buddy's life, but in the process is shot in the head. The injury results in brain damage to the point where he basically has a child's brain in a (very large) man's body. When they get out of the army the two open up a bar together, but some local gangsters make things tough for them after they refuse to take part in brutal "cage" matches where fighters battle to the point of serious injury and/or death.

Cast
 Lou Ferrigno as Billy Thomas
 Reb Brown as Scott Monroe
 Michael Dante as Tony Baccola
 Mike Moroff as Mario
 Marilyn Tokuda as Morgan Garrett
 Al Leong as Tiger Joe
 James Shigeta as Tin Lum Yin
 Branscombe Richmond as Diablo
 Tiger Chung Lee as Chang
 Al Ruscio as Costello
 Daniel Martine as Mono
 Rion Hunter as Chao Tung
 Dana Lee as Pang
 Maggie Mae Miller as Meme
 Paul Sorensen as Matt
 Danny Trejo as Costello's Bodyguard (uncredited)

Pre-production
When cast, Lou Ferrigno did extensive research on underground cage match-style fighting, soldier life after injuries, and PTSD. Reb Brown did not.

Reception
The film received a modest reception from critics. Kevin Thomas of the Los Angeles Times called it "an exceptionally stylish and dynamic martial-arts movie".

Ferrigno noted in his interview for Charleston City Paper: "Personally, my favorite dramatic role was in a movie I did with Reb Brown called Cage."

References

External links
 
 

1989 films
1989 martial arts films
American martial arts films
Martial arts tournament films
Underground fighting films
Vietnam War films
1980s English-language films
1980s American films